Xestia baja, the dotted clay, is a species of moth of the family Noctuidae. It is found in Europe, Turkey, northern Iran, Transcaucasia, the Caucasus, central Asia, Siberia, Mongolia, Tibet, China, Korea and Japan.

Technical description and variation

The wingspan is 35–40 mm. Forewing dull red brown, with slight lilac-grey tinge in places; a distinct black preapical costal bar; upper stigmata large, with slight pale rings; lower lobe of reniform dark; median shade forming a brown space between the stigmata; a black dot near base of cell; hindwing ochreous or yellowish grey. ab. bajula Stgr. is smaller than the type and suffused with grey, without any red tinge; in the northern form punctata Auriv, the lines are prominently marked by dots on the veins; purpurea Tutt, grisea Tutt and coerulescens Tutt are merely colour variations.

Biology
The moth flies from July to August depending on the location.

Larva polyphagous, brown or grey, with a red tinge; the lines pale; a row of oblique dark sublateral bars; a pale bar on segment 12; head pale brown. The larvae feed on Myrica gale, Rubus species and other plants and trees.

References

External links

Lepiforum
 Funet
 Fauna Europaea
Dotted Clay on UKmoths

Xestia
Moths of Europe
Moths of Asia